Green Hills of Africa is a 1935 work of nonfiction by American writer Ernest Hemingway. Hemingway's second work of nonfiction, Green Hills of Africa is an account of a month on safari he and his wife, Pauline Marie Pfeiffer, took in East Africa during December 1933. Green Hills of Africa is divided into four parts: "Pursuit and Conversation", "Pursuit Remembered", "Pursuit and Failure", and "Pursuit as Happiness", each of which plays a different role in the story.

Synopsis
Much of the narrative describes Hemingway's adventures hunting in East Africa, interspersed with ruminations about literature and authors. Generally the East African landscape Hemingway describes is in the region of Lake Manyara in Tanzania.

The book starts with Part 1 ("Pursuit and Conversation"), with Hemingway and a European expat in conversation about American writers. Relations between the white hunters and native trackers are described, as well as Hemingway's jealousy of the other hunters. Part 2 ("Pursuit Remembered") presents a flashback of hunting in northern Tanzania with a description of the Rift Valley and descriptions of how to field dress prey. Hemingway kills a rhino, but his friend Karl kills a bigger one. The literary discussion moves to European writers such as Tolstoy, Flaubert, Stendhal, and Dostoevsky. In Part 3 ("Pursuit and Failure") the action returns to the present with Hemingway unlucky in hunting, unable to find a kudu he tracks. He moves to an untouched piece of country with the native trackers. In Part 4 ("Pursuit and Happiness") Hemingway and some of his trackers arrive at seemingly virgin country. There he kills a kudu bull with huge horns (52 inches). Back in the camp, he discovers that Karl killed a kudu with bigger horns. He is initially jealous of Karl’s luck, but overcomes this. The actions of his guides suggest that they respect him.

Background and publication history
Green Hills of Africa (1935) initially appeared in serialization in Scribner's Magazine, and was published in 1935. An autobiographical account of his 1933 trip to Africa, Hemingway presents the subject of big game hunting in a non-fiction form in Green Hills of Africa. The serialization occurred from May to November 1935. The book was published on 25 October 1935 to a first edition print-run of 10,500 copies.

Reception

Green Hills of Africa initially got a cool reception. Writing for The New York Times, critic John Chamberlain claimed: "Green Hills of Africa is not one of the major Hemingway works. Mr. Hemingway has so simplified his method that all his characters talk the lingo perfected in The Sun Also Rises, whether these characters are British, Austrian, Arabian, Ethiopian or Kikuyu." However, two days later, writing for the same newspaper, critic C. G. Poore hailed The Green Hills of Africa as "the best-written story of big-game hunting anywhere I have read. And more than that. It's a book about people in unacknowledged conflict and about the pleasures of travel and the pleasures of drinking and war and peace and writing." Despite the better review, Hemingway said the book critics "killed" the book. He went into a deep depression, and said he was "ready to blow my lousy head off". Within a few months he was ready to blame the corrupting influence of the wealthy women in his life—his wife Pauline and his mistress Jane Mason. The result of his bitterness were two stories about Africa: "The Short Happy Life of Francis Macomber" and "The Snows of Kilimanjaro", that featured husbands married to domineering women.

Literary analysis
The foreword of Green Hills of Africa immediately identifies this as a work of nonfiction that should be compared with similar works of fiction: 
Unlike many novels, none of the characters or incidents in this book is imaginary.  Any one not finding sufficient love interest is at liberty, while reading it, to insert whatever love interest he or she may have at the time.  The writer has attempted to write an absolutely true book to see whether the shape of a country and the pattern of a month's action can, if truly presented, compete with a work of the imagination.

The book is well known today for a line that has nearly nothing to do with its subject. This quote is frequently used as evidence that Adventures of Huckleberry Finn is The Great American Novel:
The good writers are Henry James, Stephen Crane, and Mark Twain. That's not the order they're good in. There is no order for good writers.... All modern American literature comes from one book by Mark Twain called Huckleberry Finn. If you read it you must stop where the Nigger Jim is stolen from the boys. That is the real end. The rest is just cheating. But it's the best book we've had. All American writing comes from that. There was nothing before. There has been nothing as good since.
One episode in Green Hills of Africa is Hemingway's conversation with the Austrian farmer Kandisky, whom Hemingway stops to help when Kandisky's truck breaks down.  After initially trading opinions on German writers like Rainer Maria Rilke and Thomas Mann and disagreeing on their views of hunting, Hemingway and the Austrian later discuss American literature over dinner, and it turns out that one of the few American writers Hemingway approves of is Henry James, whom he mentions twice.

Specifically, Hemingway says: "The good American writers are Henry James, Stephen Crane, and Mark Twain”  and adds later that  “Henry James wanted to make money. He never did, of course”.  Intermixed with these comments on James, Crane, and Twain are Hemingway’s views of American writers in general, most of whom, he says, came to a bad end.  When Kandisky asks about himself Hemingway tells him, "I am interested in other things. I have a good life but I must write because if I do not write a certain amount I do not enjoy the rest of my life.”   When asked what he wants, Hemingway replies, “To write as well as I can and learn as I go along. At the same time, I have my life which I enjoy and which is a damned good life."

References

Further reading

External links
 

1935 non-fiction books
American travel books
Books about Africa
Books by Ernest Hemingway
Charles Scribner's Sons books